Choi Yoon-so (born November 29, 1984) is a South Korean actress. She is notable for portraying the villainous and ruthless Koo Hae-joo in the daily drama series Unknown Woman.

Filmography

Film

Television series

Television shows

Music video appearance

Awards and nominations

References

External links

 at J-Wide Entertainment 

South Korean film actresses
South Korean television actresses
South Korean television personalities
Living people
1984 births
People from Jeonju
Dongduk Women's University alumni
21st-century South Korean actresses
Yoon-so